is a railway station on the privately operated Chōshi Electric Railway Line in Chōshi, Chiba, Japan.

Lines

Station layout

The station is staffed, and consists of two side platforms serving two tracks. This is the only station on the line where trains can pass in opposite directions.

The station is also the location for a power substation with a 300 kW silicon rectifier which supplies 600 V DC to the line's overhead wires. A loop and siding for freight services originally existed behind the up platform, but the loop was later removed, leaving just the siding. Withdrawn EMU car DeHa 101 was previously dumped in this siding, but was disposed of in September 2009 to make space to store newly delivered 2000 series set 2002 awaiting modifications at Nakanochō depot.

History

Kasagami-Kurohae Station opened on 1 July 1925. The station name combined the name of the Kasagami-chō area in which the station was located with the name of the neighbouring Kurohae area, which was famous for roof tiles which were transported by the railway.

In June 1995, a head-on collision occurred north of Kasagami-Kurohae Station between DeHa 701 on a down (Tokawa-bound) service and DeHa 1001 on an up (Chōshi-bound) service. Both cars sustained front-end damage, but were later repaired and returned to traffic.

In May 2010, the platforms were extended to handle two-car trains in preparation for the entry into service of new 2000 series trains, and new access ramps were added.

From 1 December 2015 for a period of one year, the station naming rights were sold to the hair product company Mesocare+, and the station signs were changed to read .

Accidents
A head-on collision occurred in June 1995 north of Kasagami-Kurohae Station between DeHa 701 on a down (Tokawa-bound) service and DeHa 1001 on an up (Chōshi-bound) service. Both cars sustained front-end damage. DeHa 701 was returned to service in April 1996 following repairs and repainting back into the standard livery of dark brown and red.

On 11 January 2014, at 08:19, 2000 series 2-car EMU set 2002 from Tokawa to Choshi derailed on points on the approach to Kasagami-Kurohae Station. Two of the train's bogies were derailed, but the train remained upright and none of the nine passengers on board was injured.

Passenger statistics
In fiscal 2010, the station was used by an average of 139 passengers daily (boarding passengers only). The passenger figures for past years are as shown below.

Surrounding area
 Chōshi Port Tower

See also
 List of railway stations in Japan

References

External links

 Choshi Electric Railway station information 

Stations of Chōshi Electric Railway Line
Railway stations in Chiba Prefecture
Railway stations in Japan opened in 1925